Bostra pyrochroa is a species of snout moth in the genus Bostra. It was described by George Hampson in 1916, and is known from New Guinea.

References

Moths described in 1916
Pyralini
Moths of New Guinea